Félix Dja Ettien Yohou (born 26 September 1979), known as Ettien, is an Ivorian retired professional footballer.

A right midfielder with great stamina and strength, he also held a Spanish passport due to the years spent in the country, all with Levante where he played 324 competitive matches – 81 of those in La Liga.

Club career
Ettien was born in Abidjan. While representing Ivory Coast in the 1997 FIFA World Youth Championship, he caught the eyes of Spanish club Levante UD, who purchased both him and his compatriot Idrissa Keita. While Keita flopped, Ettien became one of the team's most important players – despite suffering racist abuse early on in his career in the country; in his first season, however, he only appeared in seven games (308 minutes) as they were relegated from the Segunda División.

As the Valencian Community side were twice promoted and relegated during his 11-year spell, Ettien was an everpresent fixture, appearing in all but four matches in the 2006–07 campaign and scoring two goals in a narrow escape from relegation in La Liga. In July 2008, he left due to the club's serious economic problems.

In September 2009, after more than one year out of football, the 30-year-old Ettien had an unsuccessful trial at Romania's FC Astra Ploieşti. In January 2011, he signed with Spanish Segunda División B side UD Alzira.

International career
After the under-20 exploits, Ettien won six caps (one goal) for the Ivorian national team, appearing against Congo DR and Madagascar in the 2002 FIFA World Cup qualification campaign.

Personal life
On 19 October 2018, after several failed business enterprises, Ettien was employed as bus driver at the Royal Spanish Football Federation, presided by his former Levante teammate Luis Rubiales.

Career statistics

Club

Honours
Levante
Segunda División: 2003–04

References

External links

1979 births
Living people
Footballers from Abidjan
Ivorian footballers
Association football midfielders
La Liga players
Segunda División players
Segunda División B players
Levante UD footballers
UD Alzira footballers
Ivory Coast under-20 international footballers
Ivory Coast international footballers
Ivorian expatriate footballers
Expatriate footballers in Spain
Ivorian expatriate sportspeople in Spain